The Western Sydney Parklands is an urban park system and a nature reserve located in Sydney, New South Wales, Australia. The NSW government has spent around $400 million for the park. The park is governed by the NSW National Parks and Wildlife Service and is listed under the National Parks and Wildlife Act 1974. The Parklands begin in the north in the City of Blacktown, cross the City of Fairfield, and end in the City of Liverpool. 

The parklands attract 430,000 to 790,000 visitors annually. In addition, the parkland provided lands for the 2000 Olympic Games.

History
The Parkland was an area of specialty for the Darug people and it is still deemed as important by the Aboriginal Land Council. The Parkland has been visited by some early settlers, such as Edward Abbott and George Johnson. The Parklands were planned in 1968, as Western Sydney needed open space and recreational areas. In the late 1970s, the northern parts of the regional park had areas for rural residential lots (near Horsley Park). In the year 2000, the parklands supplied venues for the Sydney Olympic Games. The boundaries of the park were completed in 2006. A year later, the walking and cycling track, which meander through the park, was finally finished and opened to public.

In November 2019, school students planted over 140,000 trees in the parkland to the rejuvenate the critically endangered Cumberland Plain Woodland community that once predominated the Sydney region.

Geography

The Parklands are formed by a series of connected green spaces, roughly following the western section of the M7 motorway and the M7 cycleway. They form an elongated shape, narrow in the east-west direction. The Parklands are bounded by the M7 motorway in the north, and begin in the suburb of Dean Park in the north, then largely follow the eastern side of the M7 motorway south to reach the M4 Western Motorway. The Parklands continue to follow the M7 motorway south, and near Cecil Hills crosses the M7 motorway to incorporate parkland on the western side of the motorway, from where it continues south, and ends in the suburb of Horningsea Park.

It features a conspicuous ridge that runs through it from north to south, providing panoramic views of Greater Western Sydney. Every entrance to the parkland contains prominent planting accompanied by a large signage to indicate access. The Parklands contain the headwaters of Eastern Creek, as a tributary of the Hawkesbury-Nepean. The north-south ridgeline in the Parklands is the catchment boundary between the Hawkesbury-Nepean, Georges River and Parramatta River catchments.

Ecology

Flora

The park has around 135 hectares of woodland areas, which are remnants of Cumberland Plain Woodland and features 180,000 plants. Most parts of the regional park are made up of 427 hectares of planted re-vegetation and cleared grassland areas. The Parkland's environment has remained very similar to how it was prior European contact. The park consists of 135 hectares of woodland, with the majority comprising 427 hectares of planted vegetation and cleared grassland areas. Until recently, the NSW Government has re-vegetated the area through the Greening Western Sydney Program. The Parkland's revegetation has been going since the early 1990s.

The parkland has three types of soil present, with the primary ones being Luddenham soil, which comes from Wianamatta Shale. Tree in the park include, Eucalyptus moluccana, Forest Red Gum, Eucalyptus tereticornis, Eucalyptus crebra, Corymbia, Corymbia maculata, Stringybark and Eucalyptus eugenioides. Shrubs include, Blackthorn, Bursaria spinosa, Themeda triandra, Themeda australis and Microlaena stipoides.

Fauna
The Park contains threatened and endangered species which are protected under State and Commonwealth legislation. Wildlife in the parks includes many native species of frogs, birds, lizards and bats. Foxes and rabbits are not rare and not unheard of. The parklands from Quakers Hill, Glendenning and all the way to Bungarribee are home to a large population of Eastern Grey Kangaroos. There is also a substantial  Fallow Deer population also.  Around eighty native vertebrate species exist within the parkland. Migratory birds are also known to visit.

One group of birds that is present all year round are the parrots. Many breed in the Parklands' trees are found, such as rainbow lorikeets, rosellas, red-rumped parrots, galahs and cockatoos. Threatened species in the park include, Meridolum corneovirens, White-faced heron, Grey-headed flying fox, little eagle, Eastern false pipistrelle, Varied sittella, East-coast free-tailed bat, Common bent-wing bat, Rüppell's broad-nosed bat and Turquoise parrot. Other species include Pandion haliaetus, Haliastur sphenurus, Haliaeetus leucogaster, Phascogale tapoatafa, Petaurus australis, Petaurus norfolcensis and Petaurus breviceps.

Recreational features

The parklands have 16 precincts and 50 park areas and has space for 3,000 people/visitors. From north to south, the following parks, reserves, geographical features and sporting facilities are incorporated into the Western Sydney Parklands. Most of the precincts below feature picnic and BBQ areas, pathways (for cycling or walking) and children's playgrounds.

Northern Parklands
 Bungarribee – A 200-hectare park which features an open space and two sealed tracks, in addition to one of Sydney’s largest off-leash dog environments. A large playground with climbing tower also exists, in addition to a large wetland that contains wildflowers. Picnic shelters and barbeques are present. The area incorporates a commercial activity, the Sydney Zoo.
 Nurragingy Reserve – To the northern ends of the park, features a Chinese garden, lake and a picnic spot.
 Blacktown Olympic Park
 The Rooty Hill

Southern Parklands
 Prospect Nature Reserve
 Eastern Creek International Raceway
 Western Sydney Regional Park – A 583 hectare park that features scenic picnic spots, recreational facilities, walking tracks and children's playgrounds
 Lizard Log
 The Dairy
 Plough and Harrow
 Moonrise Lookout
 Sugarloaf Ridge
 TreeTops Adventure Park
 Calmsley Hill City Farm 
 Sydney International Equestrian Centre
 Shale Hills 
 Western Sydney International Dragway
 Sydney International Shooting Centre
 Kemps Creek Nature Reserve

In addition to above, the Parklands contains market gardens, former military places and infrastructural facilities such as water supply canal, pipelines, electricity, gas and water easements, waste services, water storage tanks and telecommunications towers. Heritage sites include the Upper Canal System, The Rooty Hill, Bungarribee Homestead complex archaeological site.

See also

 Protected areas of New South Wales
 List of parks in Sydney
 Blue Mountains National Park
 Cumberland Plain Woodland
 Western Sydney Regional Park

References

External links
Plan of Management
Western Sydney Parklands Biodiversity
Plan management of Sydney Regional Park
"The Lungs for Sydney's West"

Nature reserves in New South Wales
Parks in Sydney
Protected areas of New South Wales
Urban forests
Forests of New South Wales
City of Blacktown
Regional parks in Australia
Protected areas established in 1968
1968 establishments in Australia
Olympic cycling venues
Venues of the 2000 Summer Olympics
City of Fairfield
City of Liverpool (New South Wales)
Western Sydney